Ceutorhynchinae is a subfamily of minute seed weevils in the family of beetles known as Curculionidae. There are at least 150 genera and more than 1000 described species in Ceutorhynchinae worldwide.

Genera
These 150 genera belong to the subfamily Ceutorhynchinae:

 Acallodes LeConte, 1876 i c g b
 Acanthoscelidius Hustache, 1930 i c g b
 Allosirocalus Colonnelli, 1983 c g b
 Amalorrhynchus Reitter, 1913 c g b
 Amalus Schönherr, 1825 i c g b
 Amicroplontus c g
 Amurocladus
 Angarocladus
 Anthypurinus c g
 Aoxyonyx c g
 Aphytobius c g
 Asperauleutes b
 Asperosoma Korotyaev, 1999 g b
 Augustinus c g
 Auleutes Dietz, 1896 i c g b
 Barioxyonyx c g
 Belonnotus c g
 Bohemanius c g
 Boragosirocalus c g
 Brachiodontus c g
 Brevicoeliodes
 Calosirus c g
 Cardipennis
 Ceutorhynchoides c g
 Ceutorhynchus Germar, 1824 i c g b
 Cnemogonus LeConte, 1876 i c g b
 Coeliastes c g
 Coeliodes c g
 Coeliodinus c g
 Coeliosomus c g
 Conocoeliodes c g
 Craponius LeConte, 1876 i c g b
 Cyphauleutes c g
 Cyphohypurus c g
 Cyphosenus c g
 Cysmemoderes c g
 Datonychidius c g
 Datonychus c g
 Dieckmannius c g
 Dietzella Champion, 1907 i g b
 Drupenatus
 Ectamnogaster c g
 Egriodes c g
 Egrius
 Eremonyx c g
 Ericomicrelus c g
 Ethelcus c g
 Eubrychius C. G. Thomson, 1859 i c g
 Eucoeliodes
 Euhrychiopsis Dietz, 1896 i g b
 Euoxyonyx c g
 Exocoeliodes c g
 Fossoronyx
 Glocianus Reitter, 1916 c g b
 Gobicladus
 Hadroplontus C.G.Thomson, 1859 c g b
 Hemioxyonyx c g
 Heorhynchus
 Hesperorrhynchus c g
 Homorosoma Frivaldszky, 1894 i c g b
 Hovanegrius c g
 Hypegrius c g
 Hypocoeliodes Faust, 1896 i c g
 Hypohypurus c g
 Hypurus Rey, 1882 i c g b
 Indicoplontus c g
 Indohypurus c g
 Indozacladus c g
 Isorhynchus c g
 Lioxyonyx c g
 Macrosquamonyx
 Marmaropus c g
 Mecysmoderes c g
 Megahypurus c g
 Mesoxyonyx c g
 Metamerus c g
 Micrelus c g
 Microplontus Wagner, 1944 c g b
 Mogulones Reitter, 1916 c g b
 Mogulonoides c
 Mononychites c g
 Mononychus Germar, 1824 i c g b
 Nedyus Schönherr, 1825 i c g b
 Neocoeliodes c g
 Neoglocianus c g
 Neohypurus c g
 Neophytobius Wagner, 1936 i c g b
 Neoplatygaster c g
 Neoxyonyx c g
 Neozacladus c g
 Notegrius c g
 Notoxyonyx c g
 Odontocoeliodes c g
 Oplitoxyonyx c g
 Oprohinus c g
 Orchestomerus Dietz, 1896 c g b
 Oreorrhynchaeus c g
 Oxyonyx c g
 Oxyonyxus c g
 Panophthalmus c g
 Paracoeliodes c g
 Parauleutes Colonnelli, 2004 g b
 Parenthis Dietz, 1896 i g b
 Parethelcus c g
 Paroxyonyx c g
 Pelenomus C.G.Thomson, 1859 c g b
 Pelenosomus Dietz, 1896 i c g b
 Pericartius c g
 Perigaster Dietz, 1896 i c g b
 Perigasteromimus Colonnelli, 1999 c g b
 Perioxyonyx
 Petrocladus
 Phoeniconyx c g
 Phrydiuchus Gozis, 1885 i c g b
 Phytobiomorphus c g
 Phytobius Schönherr, 1833 i c g b
 Platygasteronyx c g
 Platypteronyx c g
 Poophagus Schönherr, 1837 i c g b
 Prisistus Reitter, 1916 c g b
 Prorutidosoma Korotyaev, 1999 g b
 Pseudocoeliodes c g
 Pseudophytobius c g
 Pseudoxyonyx c g
 Ranunculiphilus c g
 Rhinoncomimus Wagner, 1940 c g b
 Rhinoncus Schönherr, 1825 i c g b
 Rileyonymus Dietz, 1896 i c g b
 Rutidosoma Stephens, 1831 i c g
 Scleropteroides c g
 Scleropterus c g
 Scythocladus
 Sinauleutes
 Sinocolus c g
 Sirocalodes Voss, 1958 i c g b
 Stenocarus c g
 Suboxyonyx c g
 Tapeinotus c g
 Tatyania c g
 Thamiocolus c g
 Theodorinus c g
 Tibetiellus c g
 Trachelanthus
 Trichocoeliodes c g
 Tricholioxyonyx c g
 Trichosirocalus Colonnelli, 1979 i c g b
 Wagnerinus c g
 Xenysmoderes c g
 Zacladius
 Zacladus c g

Data sources: i = ITIS, c = Catalogue of Life, g = GBIF, b = Bugguide.net

References

Further reading

External links

 

Curculionidae
Taxa named by Johannes von Nepomuk Franz Xaver Gistel